The 30th Massachusetts General Court, consisting of the Massachusetts Senate and the Massachusetts House of Representatives, met in 1809 and 1810 during the governorship of Christopher Gore. Harrison Gray Otis served as president of the Senate and Timothy Bigelow served as speaker of the House.

Senators

Representatives

See also
 11th United States Congress
 List of Massachusetts General Courts

References

External links
 . (Includes data for state senate and house elections in 1809)
 
 
 
 

Political history of Massachusetts
Massachusetts legislative sessions
massachusetts
1809 in Massachusetts
massachusetts
1810 in Massachusetts